Christina Larner (22 September 1933  27 April 1983) was a British historian with pioneering studies about European witchcraft and a Professor of Sociology at the University of Glasgow. She was an expert on the history of witchcraft in Scotland.

Early life and education 
Christina Larner was born in London, the daughter of Helen Margaret Wallace and John MacDonald Ross, senior civil servant, who both went to university. After attending South Hampstead High School for Girls (London), she matriculated and graduated with first class honours in Modern History in 1957 at the University of Edinburgh. She was awarded a PhD at the University of Edinburgh for her thesis 'Continental Influences on Scottish Demonology, 1560–1700’ in 1962.

Academical career 
After graduating from the University of Edinburgh, Larner moved to the University of Glasgow as a part-time assistant in the Department of Politics and Sociology in 1966. In 1972, she was appointed Lecturer in Sociology and was subsequently Senior Lecturer. She was awarded a titular professorship at the University of Glasgow in the same year as she died.

Private life 
In 1960, she married John Patrick Larner, a historian of Renaissance Italy. They had two sons, Patrick and Gavin.

Selected list of published works 
 A Source-book of Scottish witchcraft (1977, 2005)
 Enemies of God (1981)
 Witchcraft and Religion (1984)
 The Thinking Peasant (1982) Glasgow: Pressgang ISBN 0946025207

References 

1933 births
1983 deaths
Alumni of the University of Edinburgh
People associated with the University of Glasgow
Witchcraft in Scotland
20th-century British historians